Alejandro José Machado (born April 26, 1982) is a former professional baseball infielder. He is a switch-hitter and throws right-handed.

Career
In  Machado hit a combined .306 with 30 stolen bases in a career-high 139 games with the Expos' Single-A Brevard and Double-A Harrisburg clubs. He posted a .399 on-base percentage between the two stops, and tied for the organization lead with his 30 steals, while ranking fourth in batting. Machado also hit five home runs with 45 RBI and 63 walks. 
 
He was among Pawtucket's most consistent players all season, and finished 10th in the International League with a .300 batting average. He also tied for the club-lead with 21 stolen bases and played tremendous defense at second base, shortstop, and even in the outfield.

The Red Sox added Machado to their roster on September 1. In ten games he posted a .200 batting average (1-for-5) with one double and four runs. His first major league run scored occurred during a strange turn of events when outfielder Gabe Kapler injured himself while running on what turned out to be a home run. After the game was halted to deal with Kapler's injury, Machado achieved his first major league run as a pinch-runner for the ailing Kapler.

He was signed by the Washington Nationals to a minor league deal in November 2006. During the 2006 Winter Meetings, Machado was taken by the Minnesota Twins in the Rule 5 draft.  After spending most of 2007 on the major league disabled list, a trade was worked out to nullify the Rule 5 draft restrictions, enabling the Twins to assign Machado to the minor leagues for the 2008 season.

He attended the Twins' 2009 major league spring training camp but was sent to minor league camp on April 1, 2009.

Machado was signed to a minor league contract on January 5, 2010, by the New York Mets.

See also
 List of Major League Baseball players from Venezuela

References

External links
, or Baseball America, or Retrosheet, or Pura Pelota (VPBL)

1982 births
Living people
Boston Red Sox players
Brevard County Manatees players
Burlington Bees players
Danville Braves players
Fort Myers Miracle players
Gulf Coast Braves players
Gulf Coast Twins players
Harrisburg Senators players
Huntsville Stars players
Leones del Caracas players
Macon Braves players
Mexican League baseball outfielders
Major League Baseball players from Venezuela
Major League Baseball second basemen
Major League Baseball shortstops
Mississippi Braves players
New Britain Rock Cats players
New Orleans Zephyrs players
Pawtucket Red Sox players
Rochester Red Wings players
Baseball players from Caracas
Tiburones de La Guaira players
Venezuelan expatriate baseball players in the United States
Wichita Wranglers players
Wilmington Blue Rocks players